was a short-lived province located in Hokkaidō, corresponding to all of modern-day Rumoi Subprefecture and the northern half of Kamikawa Subprefecture.

History
After 1869, the northern Japanese island was known as Hokkaido; and regional administrative subdivisions were identified, including Teshio Province.
August 15, 1869 Teshio Province established with 6 districts
1872 Census finds a population of 1,576
1882 Provinces dissolved in Hokkaidō

Districts
Mashike (増毛郡)
Rumoi (留萌郡)
Tomamae (苫前郡)
Teshio (天塩郡)
Nakagawa (中川郡)
Kamikawa (上川郡)

Notes

References
 Nussbaum, Louis-Frédéric and Käthe Roth. (2005).  Japan encyclopedia. Cambridge: Harvard University Press. ;  OCLC 58053128

Former provinces of Japan